Mehrdad Abedi ( مهرداد عابدی،; born 1948) is an electrical engineer and electric machinery researcher and professor of power engineering at Amirkabir University of Technology.

Life and career 
Abedi was born in 1948 in Tehran, Iran. He graduated from the University of Tehran with a degree in electrical engineering In 1970, he received an MS degree from Imperial College London in 1973 and a Ph.D from Newcastle University, both in electrical engineering with a speciality in electric machinery and power engineering.

After graduation, he worked at General Electric Company plc as a researcher for one year and then returned to Tehran and began his work at Amirkabir University of Technology as an instructor. He is principally known as the author of some textbooks for undergraduate electrical engineering students (in Persian).

Abedi is a member of the Iranian Academy of Sciences.

Books written in Persian (until 2008)
 Basic of Electrical Machines (12th Edition), 2007
 Power System Analysis (3rd edition), 2006
 Modern Power System Analysis (4th edition),2003 (books of the year)
 Distribution Systems, (2nd edition), 1990
 Electrical Machines with Power Electronic Applications, (7th edition 2008), (book of the year)
 Electrical Machines, Analysis, Operation and Control (15th edition), 2008
 Basic Circuit Analysis (7th edition), 2008
 Basic Control Systems, (2nd edition), 2002
 Electric Circuits (4 Volumes),2008
 Electrical Machines (4 Volumes), (2nd Edition), 2008
 Basics of Electrical Machines, 2007
 Basics of Electrical Circuits, 2007

Awards and honors
 Distinguished professor of Amirkabir University, 1994, Iran
 Distinguished researcher, ministry of energy, 1993, Iran
 Member of Iranian academy of science, Iran, 1991-now
 Distinguished author (book of the year), Tehran university, 1995, Iran
 Member of scientific committee of annual international conference in power systems, Iran, 1993-now
 Member of scientific committee of Iranian international conference in electrical engineering, 1993-now
 Member of editorial board of Amirkabir Journal of science and technology, Amirkabir university, Iran, 1987–2005
 Member of editorial board, Journal of Electricity, ministry of energy, Iran, 1993-now
 Distinguished professor and prize winner all over Iran selected by ministry of Higher Education 2001.
 Distinguished author (book of the year) selected by Iranian Energy Committee. 2001
 Prizewinner as innovator, selected by Iranian Elect. Eng. Society. 2003.
 Head of Electrical Engineering Section Iranian Academy of Science.2003-2006
 Appointed as Honorary Lecturer, University of Birmingham, U.K, 2007

References

1948 births
Living people
Scientists from Tehran
Academic staff of Amirkabir University of Technology
University of Tehran alumni
Iranian electrical engineers
Alumni of Imperial College London
Alumni of Newcastle University